Kennedy Kofi Boateng (born 29 November 1996) is a professional footballer who plays as a centre-back for Portuguese club Santa Clara. Born in Ghana, he plays for the Togo national team.

Club career
Boateng made his Austrian Football First League debut for LASK Linz on 23 September 2016 in a game against FC Blau-Weiß Linz.

On 2 July 2021, Boateng signed a two-year contract with Santa Clara in Portugal.

International career
Boateng was born in Ghana, and is of Togolese descent through his mother. He was called up to represent the Togo national team in November 2021. He debuted for Togo in a 3–0 friendly win over Sierra Leone on 24 March 2022.

Career statistics

Club

International

References

External links
 

1996 births
Living people
Togolese footballers
Togo international footballers
Ghanaian footballers
Togolese people of Ghanaian descent
Ghanaian people of Togolese descent
Sportspeople of Togolese descent
Sportspeople of Ghanaian descent
Citizens of Togo through descent
Association football defenders
LASK players
2. Liga (Austria) players
Austrian Football Bundesliga players
FC Juniors OÖ players
SV Ried players
C.D. Santa Clara players
Primeira Liga players
Togolese expatriate footballers
Togolese expatriate sportspeople in Austria
Expatriate footballers in Austria
Togolese expatriate sportspeople in Portugal
Expatriate footballers in Portugal
Ghanaian expatriate footballers
Ghanaian expatriate sportspeople in Austria
Ghanaian expatriate sportspeople in Portugal